Barretos is a municipality in the northern part of the state of São Paulo, Brazil. The city has approximately 122,833 inhabitants (IBGE/2020) and an area of 1566.1 km². Barretos belongs to the Mesoregion of Ribeirão Preto.

History

The city was founded on August 25, 1854. The first chapel was built in 1856, where today lies the "Praça Francisco Barreto". On January 8, 1897, Barretos was officially established as a municipality.

Economy

The tertiary sector of the city is the most relevant, with 72.09% of the city GDP. Industry is 21.64% of the GDP, and the primary sector corresponds to 6.28%. The largest Latin American cancer center is based in this city.

Culture

Barretos hosts annually the most famous rodeo festival in the country, the Festa do Peão de Barretos. The city is the seat of the Roman Catholic Diocese of Barretos.

Transportation

SP-326 Rodovia Brigadeiro Faria Lima
SP-425 Rodovia Assis Chateaubriand

Barretos is served by Chafei Amsei Airport, which offers general aviation but no scheduled flights.

Sports
Barretos EC - a football club that is in the Campeonato Paulista Segunda Divisão.

Notable people
 
 
Douglas Camilo da Silva (born 1990), footballer

References

External links
  http://www.barretos.sp.gov.br Prefecture of Barretos
  https://web.archive.org/web/20050225231012/http://www.citybrazil.com.br/sp/barretos/
  http://www.independentes.com.br

 
Populated places established in 1854
1854 establishments in Brazil